The Clubfoot (also known as The Club-Footed Boy) is a 1642 oil on canvas painting by Jusepe de Ribera. It is housed in the Musée du Louvre in Paris (part of the La Caze bequest of 1869), and was painted in Naples. Art historian Ellis Waterhouse wrote of it as "a touchstone by which we can interpret the whole of Ribera's art".

Commissioned by a Flemish dealer, the painting features a Neapolitan beggar boy with a deformed foot. Behind him is a vast and luminous landscape, against which the boy stands with a gap-toothed grin, wearing earth-toned clothes and holding his crutch slung over his left shoulder. Written in Latin on the paper in the boy's hand is the sentence "DA MIHI ELEMOSINAM PROPTER AMOREM DEI" ("Give me alms, for the love of God").

History
This is one of the painter's last works, and one of the most bitter. The contrast of light and shade gave him pleasure. He studied the composition of the Renaissance painters in Italy, and perhaps also the work of Flemish artists, but in spite of all that, he clung to the profoundly Spanish tradition of realism, even after having spent nearly all his life in Italy.

Moved by a Christian awareness of human weakness, Spanish artists often painted pictures of the poor and disabled. Here the young Neapolitan vagabond seems to be making game of his own infirmity; he is also careful to inform us, by means of the scrap of writing he holds, that he is dumb as well as crippled, because he appeals to the charity of the passer-by with that card written in Latin.

The motif is surely a derivation of taste for scenes of low life in art, as instituted by Caravaggio and followed by Ribera, who was in Naples his most fervent admirer in the realist vein.

Notes

Further reading
 (no. 60)

External links
 The Clubfoot, Louvre
 Lubbock, Tom. de Ribera, Jusepe: The Boy with the Club Foot (1642), The Independent, 14 March 2008.
 The Clubfoot, on Artble website. Accessed 13 January 2012

Paintings by Jusepe de Ribera
1642 paintings
Paintings in the Louvre by Spanish artists